The dairy industry in the United Kingdom is the industry of dairy farming that takes place in the UK.

Production

In Europe, UK milk production is third after France & Germany and is around the tenth highest in the world. There are around 12,000 dairy farms in the UK.

Around 14 billion litres of milk are commercially produced in the UK each year. 

Britain eats around 2000 tonnes of cheese a day.

Production sites

Buckinghamshire
 Arla Aylesbury, produces 10% of the UK's milk, and the world's largest milk production site

Cornwall
 Davidstow Creamery, Britain's largest cheese factory, producing Cathedral City cheddar cheese

Delivery
Only 3% of milk in the UK is delivered to the door. There was an 80% drop in deliveries when supermarkets began to sell their own milk en-masse. The largest commercial deliverer of milk in the UK has around 500,000 customers; there has been a recent upswing in demand for door deliveries.

Regulation
Production was regulated by the Milk Marketing Board until 1994; its processing division is now Dairy Crest. AHDB Dairy is a central resource for the UK dairy industry.

References

External links

 NFU
 RSPCA

Dairy farming in the United Kingdom
Dairy industry